Ammonium hexafluoroaluminate is an inorganic compound with the chemical formula of (NH4)3[AlF6]. It is a white solid.  Upon heating, it converts to aluminium trifluoride, a reaction that releases hydrogen fluoride.  It has also been used as a precursor to zeolites.

Preparation
Ammonium hexafluoroaluminate can be obtained by the reaction of ammonium fluoride and aluminium hydroxide.

References

Aluminium complexes
Fluoro complexes
Ammonium compounds
Fluorometallates